Lemonville may refer to:

Lemonville, Ontario, Canada
Lemonville, Texas, United States